Květa Fialová (1 September 1929 – 26 September 2017) was a Czech actress. She was best known for her performance in Lemonade Joe.

Selected filmography

External links
 

1929 births
2017 deaths
People from Lučenec District
Czech film actresses
Czech Buddhists
Czech stage actresses
Czech television actresses
20th-century Czech actresses
21st-century Czech actresses
Recipients of the Thalia Award